Guillaume is the French equivalent of William (name), which is of old Germanic origin.

Among its oldest well-known carriers was Charlemagne's cousin William of Gellone.

People with this surname
Albert Guillaume (1873–1942), French caricaturist
Alfred Guillaume (1888–1966), Islamic scholar
Augustin Guillaume (1895–1983), French general 
Charles Édouard Guillaume (1861–1938), French-Swiss physicist
Edith Guillaume (1943–2013), Danish opera singer
Günter Guillaume (1927–1995), a close aide to West German chancellor Willy Brandt who turned out to be a spy for East Germany's secret service
Gustave Guillaume (1883–1960), French linguist
Henri Guillaume (1812–1877), Belgian general and military historian
Jacquette Guillaume (fl. 1665), French writer
James Guillaume (1844–1916), anarchist
Jean Guillaume (1918–2001), Belgian writer
Jean-Baptiste Claude Eugène Guillaume (1822–1905), French sculptor
Paul Guillaume (1891–1934), French art dealer 
Pierre Guillaume (born 1941), book-shop founder
Robert Guillaume (1927–2017 as Robert P. Williams), American stage and television actor
Sylvain Guillaume (born 1968), French skier

See also
Guillaume (given name)
Guillaume (disambiguation)

References

French-language surnames
Surnames from given names